The 1980 North Dakota Fighting Sioux football team, also known as the Nodaks, was an American football team that represented the University of North Dakota in the North Central Conference (NCC) during the 1980 NCAA Division II football season.

Schedule

References 

North Dakota
North Dakota Fighting Hawks football seasons
North Dakota Fighting Sioux football